James Allen Latané (January 15, 1831 – February 21, 1902) was an American Protestant priest who after the American Civil War became bishop and eventually Presiding Bishop of the Reformed Episcopal Church.

Early and family life

Born in Essex County, Virginia to the former Susanna Allen (1797-1878) and her husband Henry Waring Latané (1782-1860), he received a private education appropriate to his class.  In the 1850 federal census, his father Henry W. Latané reported owning 49 slaves in Essex County. As had at least his eldest brother, Dr. Thomas Latané (1824-1906), James Latané traveled to Charlottesville, Virginia for higher education, and graduated from the University of Virginia. He later traveled to Alexandria, Virginia for theological studies and graduated from the Virginia Theological Seminary.

In 1855, James Allen Latané married Mary Minor Holladay (1837-1922). Her lawyer father, John Z. Holladay (1806-1842), began representing Louisa County, Virginia in the Virginia House of Delegates about a year before his death of typhoid fever at Scottsville in Albemarle County. This happened when Mary was a girl, but her sisters both married into the First Families of Virginia. The couple would have two sons and at least six daughters, most of whom never married.

Career

Latané was ordained as an Episcopal priest. He served at a parish in Staunton, Virginia for more than a decade.

His father died in 1860, shortly before the American Civil War. As Virginia decided to secede from the Union in 1861, Dr. Thomas Latané and several of his brothers enlisted in the Confederate States Army. At least two of the brothers joined the Essex Light Dragoons of the 9th Virginia Cavalry. William Latané (1833-1862) became the only fatality of JEB Stuart's well-publicized raid around Union General McClellan's army during the Peninsular Campaign. John R. Thompson's poem about the event was published in Richmond, and painting about his interment in nearby Middlesex County, Virginia by William D. Washington became an important fundraiser during the conflict and eventually part of Lost Cause iconography. Lt. John Latané (1838-1864), who had also joined the Essex Light Dragoons of the 9th Virginia Cavalry, had arranged for his brother's burial, and himself died while imprisoned in Washington, D.C. and would be buried among the Confederate dead in Hollywood Cemetery in the state capitol. [His twin, Lewis Latane (1838-1864) also died that year and has at least a burial marker in the St. Paul's Episcopal Church cemetery in Miller's Corner in Essex County.] However, their brother Henry Waring Latane Jr. (1828-1892) was buried at the cemetery of the Reformed Episcopal Church at Miller's Corner founded by this brother, and the gravestone indicates he had served as senior warden of that new church.

In 1874, Rev. Latané was rector of historic St. Mathew's Episcopal Church in Wheeling, West Virginia, but decided to join the breakaway Reformed Episcopal Church. He was consecrated as a bishop of that church on June 22, 1879, in Philadelphia, and ultimately became that denomination's Presiding Bishop from May, 1900 until his death.

Death and legacy

Rt. Rev. Latane and his wife are buried at Hollywood Cemetery in Richmond, Virginia. At least one daughter, Edith Latané, would remain with the Episcopal Church and helped found St. Margaret's School in Tappahannock in Essex County. That boarding school remains in operation today. The University of Virginia library holds many of the family's papers.

See also 
 List of bishops of the Reformed Episcopal Church

References

External links 

 

1831 births
1902 deaths
American Reformed Episcopalians
Presiding Bishops of the Reformed Episcopal Church
19th-century American clergy